) was a  74-gun ship of the line of the French Navy during the French Revolutionary Wars. Launched in 1794, the ship saw service in the Atlantic against the British Royal Navy.

She was part of the fleet that sailed in December 1796 on the disastrous Expédition d'Irlande. After unsuccessful attempts to land troops on Ireland, the Droits de l'Homme headed back to her home port of Brest with the soldiers still on board. Two British frigates were waiting to intercept stragglers from the fleet, and engaged Droits de l'Homme in the action of 13 January 1797. Heavily damaged by the British ships and unable to manoeuvre in rough seas, the ship struck a sandbar and was wrecked. Hundreds of people died in the disaster.

Construction and naming
The ship was built at Port-Liberté (now Lorient) and launched on 10 Prairial de l'An II (29 May 1794). Her name, awarded on 29 November 1793, refers to the 1789 Declaration of the Rights of Man and of the Citizen, one of the founding documents of the French Revolution.

Service history

Droits de l'Homme was lightly involved in Battle of Groix, on 22 June 1795, firing few if any shots during the battle.

Expédition d'Irlande
In December 1796 Droits de l'Homme, under capitaine de vaisseau Raymond de Lacrosse, took part in the invasion attempt against Ireland, carrying 549 soldiers. On their way, the fleet was dispersed by tempests. The Droits de l'Homme arrived at Bantry Bay and cruised off the coast, capturing the brigs Cumberland and Calypso. She stayed there for eight days to ascertain that no French ship was in distress on the coast, and departed for Brittany.

The sea was rough, preventing Droits de l'Homme from using her lower deck batteries and from boarding the British. Lacrosse was wounded; he gave command of the ship to his second officer, Prévost de Lacroix, and had his crew swear not to strike their colours.

After 13 hours of combat, running out of ammunition, the British broke contact when Indefatigable sighted land ahead. Indefatigable, despite having damage to her masts and rigging, managed to beat off the lee shore and escape Penmarch reefs; Amazon ran aground and was destroyed near Plozévet, and her crew captured. Droits de l'Homme, having lost her rudder, masts and anchors, ran aground off Plozévet.

Some of the crew were rescued by the ship's boats and fishing boats from nearby villages, but the rescue was interrupted for five days by the storm; 60 men died for lack of food and water. General Jean-Amable Humbert, who was commanding the soldiers aboard, narrowly escaped drowning, and between 250 and 390 men died in the wreck. Captain Lacrosse was last to leave the ship.

Commemoration
In 1840, Major Pipon, an English officer who had been a prisoner aboard, erected an inscribed menhir on the coast in remembrance of the tragedy. In 1876 it was broken into several pieces by the weather, but restored in 1882.

References

External links 

 

Ships of the line of the French Navy
Téméraire-class ships of the line
Shipwrecks in the Bay of Biscay
1794 ships
Maritime incidents in 1797
Ships built in France